Oxygen-16 (16O) is a stable isotope of oxygen, having 8 neutrons and 8 protons in its nucleus. Oxygen-16 is the most abundant isotope of oxygen and accounts for 99.762% of oxygen's natural abundance. The relative and absolute abundance of 16O are high because it is a principal product of stellar evolution and because it is a primordial isotope, meaning it can be made by stars that were initially made exclusively of hydrogen. Most 16O is synthesized at the end of the helium fusion process in stars; the triple-alpha process creates 12C, which captures an additional 4He to make 16O. The neon-burning process creates additional 16O. Oxygen-16 is doubly magic.

Solid samples (organic and inorganic) for 16O studies are usually stored in silver cups and measured with pyrolysis and mass spectrometry. Researchers need to avoid improper or prolonged storage of the samples for accurate measurements.

Oxygen-16 was originally the standard from which the atomic masses of all nuclides were defined, i.e., one atomic mass unit was defined as  the mass of oxygen-16, though the atomic mass unit has since been redefined relative to carbon-12.

References 

Oxygen-16